The 2011–12 Georgia State Panthers men's basketball team represented Georgia State University during the 2011–12 NCAA Division I men's basketball season. The team's head coach was Ron Hunter in first season at GSU. They played their home games at GSU Sports Arena and are members of the Colonial Athletic Association (CAA). They finished the season 21–12, 11–7 in CAA play to finish in sixth place. They lost in the quarterfinals of the CAA Basketball tournament to George Mason. They were invited to the 2012 CollegeInsider.com Tournament where they defeated Tennessee Tech in the first round before falling in the second round to eventual tournament winner Mercer.

Season notes
During the November 29 away game at South Carolina State, Georgia State set a record margin of victory at any away game of 31 points.
On the December 1 game against FIU, Georgia State set a school record of 14 rejections (blocked shots). The previous record was 12 on January 29, 2000 against Troy.
During the 2011–12 season, the schools winning streak record was extended to 11 consecutive games ranging from the November 18th game against McNeese State game to the January 4th game against VCU.
Eric Buckner set the career blocks record for the university at 167.
Eric Buckner set the season blocks record for the university at 117.
Jihad Ali set the career-games played record at 126 games.
During the CAA tournament, Georgia State set the tournament record for largest margin of victory against Hofstra at 35 points.

Roster

Class of 2012 Commitments

Schedule

|-
!colspan=8 style=|Exhibition

|-
!colspan=8 style=|Regular Season

|-
!colspan=8 style=| CAA Tournament

|-
!colspan=8 style=| CollegeInsider.com Tournament

References

Georgia State Panthers men's basketball seasons
Georgia State
Georgia State
Georgia State Panthers men's basket
Georgia State Panthers men's basket